Pseudochoeromorpha ochracea is a species of beetle in the family Cerambycidae. It was described by James Thomson in 1878.

References

Mesosini
Beetles described in 1878